Drapetes is a genus of beetles belonging to the family Elateridae.

The genus has almost cosmopolitan distribution.

Selected Species

 Drapetes abei
 Drapetes advenus
 Drapetes araratensis
 Drapetes aterrimus
 Drapetes bicoloris
 Drapetes bimaculatus
 Drapetes brevicollis
 Drapetes cayennensis
 Drapetes chiricahua
 Drapetes corticalis
 Drapetes crocopus
 Drapetes cruentus
 Drapetes degener
 Drapetes depressus
 Drapetes dorsalis
 Drapetes dubius
 Drapetes ecarinatus
 Drapetes equestris
 Drapetes equiseti
 Drapetes europaeus
 Drapetes exstriatus
 Drapetes flavatus
 Drapetes flavipes
 Drapetes flexuosus
 Drapetes fuscus
 Drapetes griseus
 Drapetes guttatus
 Drapetes haematoceras
 Drapetes heydeni
 Drapetes inunctus
 Drapetes jansoni
 Drapetes kashyapi
 Drapetes laticollis
 Drapetes latus
 Drapetes lineolus
 Drapetes maculatus
 Drapetes maurus
 Drapetes mediorufus
 Drapetes modestus
 Drapetes montanus
 Drapetes mordelloides
 Drapetes niger
 Drapetes nigricans
 Drapetes nigricornis
 Drapetes nigrinus
 Drapetes nigripes
 Drapetes pannus
 Drapetes picipes
 Drapetes plagiatus
 Drapetes planatus
 Drapetes prolifericornis
 Drapetes pullus
 Drapetes purpureus
 Drapetes pygmaeus
 Drapetes quadrifoveatus
 Drapetes quadripustulatus
 Drapetes rotundoextremus
 Drapetes rubricollis
 Drapetes rufipalpis
 Drapetes rufiventris
 Drapetes sanguineus
 Drapetes sellatus
 Drapetes serraticornis
 Drapetes sexmaculatus
 Drapetes signatipennis
 Drapetes signatulus
 Drapetes socialis
 Drapetes spatulatus
 Drapetes spissus
 Drapetes submaculatus
 Drapetes subnivosus
 Drapetes subparallelus
 Drapetes sulcatus
 Drapetes taeniatus
 Drapetes talyshensis
 Drapetes tetraspilotus
 Drapetes thoracicus
 Drapetes torigaii
 Drapetes truncatus
 Drapetes ustulatus
 Drapetes vilis

References

Elateridae
Elateridae genera